Richard Joseph Frankland is an Australian playwright, scriptwriter and musician. He is an Aboriginal Australian of Gunditjmara origin from Victoria. He has worked significantly for the Aboriginal Australian cause.

Biography
Richard J. Frankland was born in Melbourne, but grew up mainly on the coast in south-west Victoria. Frankland has worked as a soldier, a fisherman, and as a field officer to the Royal Commission into Aboriginal Deaths in Custody. This experience inspired him to write several plays, including No Way to Forget, Who Killed Malcolm Smith and Conversations with the Dead.

Frankland won an AFI Award for Best Screenplay in a Short for his short film No Way to Forget. It was the first film by an Indigenous director to win an AFI Award. It was broadcast nationally on SBS TV. It screened at the 1996 Cannes Film Festival in the category of Un Certain Regard.

He wrote and directed Harry's War, a feature film based on his uncle's role in World War II on the Kokoda Trail. The film was screened at the British War Memorial in London and won Best Short Film at Spike Lee's alternative Oscars for black film-makers in Hollywood.

In 2004, his play, Conversations with the Dead, was performed at the United Nations.

Frankland is also a musician, whose music features on the soundtracks to many of his films. In 1992 his first band Djaambi supported Prince on his Australian tour. He formed The Charcoal Club in 1990, with a number of Indigenous and non-Indigenous members. They released three albums on CD: The Charcoal Club (2002), Cry Freedom (2005) and Hearts Full of Rust (2010). A Facebook page for them is still active .

In the early nineties he founded Mirimbiak Nations Aboriginal Corporation (MNAC) which was the first Indigenous statewide land organisation in some twenty five years.  MNAC was responsible for representing traditional owners and lodging all native title claims throughout the state of Victoria (excepting the already lodged Yorta Yorta, claim but including the recently successful Gunditjmara claim). Richard was also instrumental in forming Defenders of Native Title (DONT), which later became Australians for Native Title and Reconciliation (ANTAR).

In 2004, he helped form the Your Voice political party, after the abolition of ATSIC, saying,

Bibliography

Plays
 Conversations with the Dead (2002)
 Walkabout (2005)

Films
 Who Killed Malcolm Smith
 No Way to Forget (1996)
 After Mabo – The Amendments
 Harry's War (1999)
 Stone Bros. (2009)

Books
 

Poem
 Two World One

Discography
 Down Three Waterholes Road – Larrikin (1997)
 Dingo's Brekky Richard Frankland and the New Senate – Blackhorn Productions (2000)
 The Charcoal Club: Meeting One The Charcoal Club – Taram Records(2002)
 Cry Freedom: Meeting Two The Charcoal Club – Taram Records (2005)

Awards and nominations
 2008 – Roz Bower Awards (Australia Council) – Awarded to Richard for his innovative leadership and significant artistic contributions, which have focused on reconciliation and social justice.
 2007 – 'Winner Outstanding Achievement' – Deadly Awards – The Circuit
 2006 – 'Band of The Year' (nominee) – Deadly Awards – Charcoal Club Band
 2004 – Uncle Jackie Charles Award – Awarded to Richard Frankland for services to Indigenous Theatre – Ilbijerri Theatre Company
 2000 – 'Best Short Film' – St Tropez Film Festival – Harry's War
 2000 – 'Best Short Film'/'3rd Most Popular Film Overall' – Black Filmmakers Hall of Fame (US) – Harry's War
 2000 – 'Best Short Film' – Atom Awards – Harry's War
 2000 – 'Best Screenplay', 'Open Craft Award' (David Ngoombujarra) – St Kilda Film Festival – Harry's War
 2000 – 'Best International Short Film' (Jury Award) – Hollywood Black Film Festival – Harry's War
 2000 – 'Best Australian Short Film' – Flickerfest – Harry's War
 1999 – 'Best Short Australian Film promoting Human Values' – Melbourne International Film Festival – Harry's War
 1998 – 'Best Visual Design (editing)' – Australian Film Institute Awards – After Mabo
 1997 – 'Best Film' – Bathurst Film Festival – No Way to Forget
 1997 – Invitation to participate in Australian Retrospective – Denver International Film Festival – No Way to forget' Denver, USA
 1996 – 'Best Short Film', 'Best Sound in a Short Film' – Australian Film Institute Awards – No Way to Forget 1996 – 'Best New Director' – Richard Frankland – St Kilda Film Festival – No Way to Forget 1993 – 'Best Documentary' – Australian Film Institute Awards – Who Killed Malcolm Smith''

References

External links
 Official website – Richard Frankland
 Golden Seahorse Productions
 
 7.30 Report Aboriginal Film Lauded in Hollywood
 Your Voice political party
 Deadly Vibe Issues No. 90 August 2004, No. 66 August 2002 and No. 49 March 2001

1963 births
Australian dramatists and playwrights
Indigenous Australian writers
Australian musicians
Indigenous Australian musicians
Australian film directors
Living people